Exmoor is an unincorporated community in Marengo County, Alabama, United States.  Exmoor had a school and post office at one time.  The school was consolidated into Sweet Water High School in the 1920s.

Geography

References

Unincorporated communities in Alabama
Unincorporated communities in Marengo County, Alabama